Bến Cầu is a township of Bến Cầu District, Tây Ninh Province, Vietnam.

References

Populated places in Tây Ninh province
District capitals in Vietnam
Townships in Vietnam